Banc Capel is a guyot, or flat-topped underwater volcano, in the Coral Sea.

Description
Banc Capel is a guyot – a former atoll with steep sides and a flat top – and is swept by strong currents. There are no sandy or muddy substrates, the surface being occupied by rocks or gravel scree.

Biodiversity
Banc Capel is inhabited by species including Nassarius alabasteroides and Laurentaeglyphea.  It is dominated by sponges, including the genus Phloedictyon and gorgonians. Other decapods found in the same trawls including the slipper lobster Ibacus brucei, the crab Randallia and swimming crabs.

Notes and references

Guyots
Seamounts of the Pacific Ocean
Coral Sea
New Caledonia
Volcanoes of Zealandia